The Ambassador from Israel to Turkey is Israel's foremost diplomatic representative in Turkey.

List of Ambassadors

Eitan Na'eh 2016 - 2018(no longer present in Turkey as of 2018)
Amira Oron 2015 - 2016
Yosef Levi-Sfari 2011 - 2015
Gabby Levy 2007 - 2011
Pinchas Avivi 2003 - 2007
David Sultan 2001 - 2003
Ori Brener 1998 - 2001
Zvi Elpeleg 1995 - 1997
David Granit 1993 - 1995
Uri-Mordechay Gordon 1990 - 1993
Eli Shaked 1983 - 1985
Shimon Amir 1978 - 1980
Shmuel Divon 1975 - 1977
Shaul Bar-Haim 1971 - 1975
Moshe Sasson 1960 - 1966
Minister Maurice Fischer 1953 - 1957
Minister Eliyahu Sasson 1950 - 1952

Consulate (Istanbul)
Consul General Yosef Levi-Sfari 2017 - 
Consul General Shai Cohen (diplomat) 2014 - 2017
Consul General Moshe Kimhi 2009 - 2014
Consul General Mordehai Amihai Bivas 2005 - 2009

References 

Turkey
Israel